Bass is an unincorporated community on the South Fork South Branch Potomac River in Hardy County, West Virginia, United States. Bass lies along County Highway 7.

Bass was so named on account of there being bass fish in the nearby creek.

References

Unincorporated communities in Hardy County, West Virginia
Unincorporated communities in West Virginia